Storenomorpha is a genus of spiders in the family Zodariidae. It was first described in 1884 by Simon. , it contains 17 species, all from Asia.

Species
Storenomorpha comprises the following species:
 S. abramovi Logunov, 2010 — Vietnam
 S. anne Jäger, 2007 — Laos
 S. arboccoae Jocqué & Bosmans, 1989 — Myanmar
 S. comottoi Simon, 1884 (type) — Myanmar
 S. dejiangensis Jiang, Guo, Yu & Chen, 2016 — China
 S. falcata Zhang & Zhu, 2010 — China
 S. hainanensis Jin & Chen, 2009 — China
 S. hongfuchui (Barrion, Barrion-Dupo & Heong, 2013) — China (Hainan)
 S. joyaus (Tikader, 1970) — India
 S. lushanensis Yu & Chen, 2009 — China
 S. nupta Jocqué & Bosmans, 1989 — Myanmar
 S. paguma Grismado & Ramírez, 2004 — Vietnam
 S. raghavai (Patel & Reddy, 1991) — India
 S. reinholdae Jocqué & Bosmans, 1989 — Thailand
 S. stellmaculata Zhang & Zhu, 2010 — China
 S. yizhang Yin & Bao, 2008 — China
 S. yunnan Yin & Bao, 2008 — China

References

Zodariidae
Araneomorphae genera
Spiders of Asia